Saleh Safir (also Romanized as Şāleḩ Şafīr; also known as Şāleḩ Şaghīr and Sāl Şaghīr) is a village in Borborud-e Gharbi Rural District, in the Central District of Aligudarz County, Lorestan Province, Iran. At the 2006 census, its population was 32, in 5 families.

References 

Towns and villages in Aligudarz County